Aceclidine (Glaucostat, Glaunorm, Glaudin) is a parasympathomimetic miotic agent used in the treatment of narrow angle glaucoma. It decreases intraocular pressure.

Adverse effects 
Side effects of aceclidine include increased salivation and bradycardia (in excessive doses).

Mechanism of action 
Aceclidine acts as a muscarinic acetylcholine receptor agonist.

See also 
 Talsaclidine (drug with a similar structure)
 Muscarine

References 

Acetate esters
Muscarinic agonists
Ophthalmology drugs
3-Quinuclidinyl esters
Drugs in the Soviet Union
Soviet inventions